The Daniel Heiner House, at 543 N. 700 East in Morgan, Utah, was listed on the National Register of Historic Places in 1978.

It is a five-bay two-story I-form central hall plan house with a two-story porch, with porch columns matching the five bays on each floor.

It was the home of pioneer Daniel Heimer, a Mormon who married his brother's widow and also married another woman, together in a double ceremony in 1873.  He was mayor of Morgan for two years and was president of the First National Bank of Morgan for 16 years.

References

National Register of Historic Places in Morgan County, Utah